"I'll Take You On" / "Hungry For Your Love" / "Hold On To Yesterday" is a 1986 single by American freestyle duo Hanson & Davis, released by New York City-based electro/dance label Fresh Records.

Composition
All songs were written and produced by Aaron Hanson and Edward J. Davis. Kurtis Mantronik of Mantronix co-wrote "Hungry for Your Love".

Larry Levan, a house music pioneer, remixed "I'll Take You On". Brian Chin of Billboard magazine called the song "[a] teen-crowd pleaser; with Lisa Lisa beat" whereas comparing the style of "Hungry for Your Love" to Shannon.

"Hungry for Your Love" has a moderate tempo of 109 beats per minute.

Track listing
12-inch single

Personnel 
Herb  Powers, Jr.mastering
Warren Tangphotography
Hanson & Davissongwriter(s), producer(s)

Performers 
Hanson & Davismixing ("Hungry for Your Love", "Hold On to Yesterday")
Larry Levanmixing ("I'll Take You On")
Brodie Williamselectric guitar ("I'll Take You On")
Mark Brownguitar
Jim Hartogsaxophone
John Hessbass guitar

Chart positions

References 

1986 EPs
Post-disco EPs
Garage house songs
Dance-pop songs
Freestyle music songs